Derospidea brevicollis is a species of skeletonizing leaf beetle in the family Chrysomelidae.

References

Further reading

External links

 

Galerucinae
Articles created by Qbugbot
Beetles described in 1865
Taxa named by John Lawrence LeConte